Kohei Ito (born 1965) is a Japanese physicist. He is the president of Keio University and Chairman of the Keio University Athletic Association. His research fields are solid-state physics, quantum computers, electronic materials, nanotechnology, and semiconductor isotope engineering. His favorite words are "the world becomes narrower if you move" and "the duty of the blessed".

Work history 
Below are the Professional Appointments of President's Biography (as of May 28, 2021).

Academic Appointments 

 Member of the Executive Committee, Physical Society of Japan (Sept. 2002–Aug. 2004)
 Member of the Governing Board, Institute for Pure and Applied Physics (Apr.2004–Mar. 2006)
 Director, Japan Society of Applied Physics (Mar. 2016–Feb. 2018)
 Research Supervisor, "Quantum State Control and Functionalization" research area of the Japan Science and Technology Agency's (JST) Precursory Research for Embryonic Science and Technology (PRESTO) Program (Apr. 2016–present)
 Program Director, Quantum Information Technology, Quantum Leap Flagship Program of the Ministry of Education, Culture, Sports, Science and Technology (MEXT Q-LEAP) (Apr. 2018–present)

Stature 

He is known as one of the pioneers in quantum computer research in Japan. He has authored more than 300 papers, including co-authors, and has been cited 8,329 times as of May 28, 2021 when he took office as President of Keio, and has an h-index of 44, which indicates the relative contribution of scientists to research (the average h-index of researchers who won the Nobel Prize in Physics for the 20 years up to 2005 is said to be around 40).

He focuses on expanding student education and challenge opportunities based on the idea that "continuing to produce world-class human resources will be the driving force for advancing research and create a good spiral." In the quantum field, which is his specialty, he invited IBM's quantum computer research base "IBM Q Network Hub" to Keio for the first time in Asia in 2018 (later followed by the University of Tokyo), and in April 2019 to strengthen AI education. He established "AI / Advanced Programming Consortium" in Tokyo. Each of them continuously supports student activities and strengthening industry-academia collaboration. In addition, the Cybathlon wheelchair competition Keio Faculty of Science and Engineering team, which was organized as a flag waving role when he was the Dean of the Faculty of Science and Technology with a view to utilizing science and technology for welfare, won the 3rd place in the world competition in 2020.

In addition to arranging student study abroad and introducing and expanding the double degree system at the university, a four-semester system that enables short-term study abroad in the summer was introduced in the Faculty of Science and Technology (in consideration of the impact on student club activities, etc., during the summer vacation) Did not move). In addition, his own laboratory also accepted international students from all over the world who aspired to research quantum computers, and in some years, international students accounted for one-third of the members of the laboratory.

In 2009, when he was a young professor, he established a YouTube channel to post lectures and laboratory introductions with the cooperation of his office work. We have created a system that allows students who do not meet their schedule due to extracurricular activities to catch up. This will later become the official Keio YouTube channel (the videos posted at the beginning of the Keio official channel were mainly lectures by Mr. Ito and other faculty members of the Faculty of Science and Engineering).

References

External links 
 Kohei Itoh Research Group website

Living people
1965 births
University of California, Berkeley alumni
Keio University alumni
Academic staff of Keio University
21st-century Japanese physicists